Bryant Clifford Meyer (sometimes credited as Clifford Meyer, BC Meyer, Cliff Meyer or Bryant C Meyer) is a keyboardist, guitarist and vocalist, best known for his tenure with Los Angeles, California-based post-metal band Isis. He was with the band since its debut full-length, Celestial, in 2000. Previously, he was a formative member of Boston-based rock band The Gersch. He is also a member of post-rock side projects Red Sparowes, Windmills by the Ocean and a solo project named Taiga.

In April 2012 it was announced that Meyer had joined Chino Moreno of Deftones, along with former bandmates Aaron Harris and Jeff Caxide, in a side project by the name of Palms. Their first album was originally slated for release in 2012, but eventually was put out by Ipecac Recordings in 2013.

Discography

With Isis

 Celestial (2000), Escape Artist Records
 SGNL>05 (2001), Neurot Recordings
 Oceanic (2002), Ipecac Recordings
 Panopticon (2004), Ipecac Recordings
 In the Fishtank 14 (2006) (Collaboration with Aereogramme), Konkurrent
 In the Absence of Truth (2006), Ipecac Recordings
 Wavering Radiant (2009), Ipecac Recordings

With Red Sparowes
 At the Soundless Dawn (2005), Neurot Recordings
 Every Red Heart Shines Toward the Red Sun (2006), Neurot Recordings
 Aphorisms (2008), Sargent House
 The Fear Is Excruciating, but Therein Lies the Answer (2010), Sargent House

With The Gersch
Bloodbottom / Listwish (1997), Tortuga Recordings
The Gersch (2006), Tortuga Recordings

With Windmills by the Ocean
 Windmills by the Ocean (2006), Robotic Empire
 Windmills by the Ocean II (2011), Robotic Empire

With Taiga
 Hsheal (2008), Conspiracy Records
 Flora Chor (2010), Conspiracy Records

With Tombs
 Path of Totality (2011), Relapse Records

With Palms

 Palms (2013)

Notes and references
Footnotes

Citations

Living people
Isis (band) members
Palms (band) members
Year of birth missing (living people)